The Blue Hills Nuclear Power Plant was a proposed commercial nuclear power plant 20 miles northeast of Jasper, Texas. It was proposed in the 1970s by the Gulf States Utilities Company. One 918 MWe pressurized water reactor was ordered in 1973, and an additional 918 MWe reactor was ordered in 1974 from Combustion Engineering. The two unit power plant proposal was canceled in 1978.

See also

List of books about nuclear issues
Nuclear power debate
Nuclear power in the United States
List of canceled nuclear plants in the United States

References

External links
 Cancelled Nuclear Units Ordered in the United States 

Cancelled nuclear power stations in the United States